Samuel Kolega (born 15 January 1999) is a Croatian alpine skier. 
He competed in giant slalom at the 2018 Winter Olympics. He is the brother of fellow alpine skier Elias Kolega. In April 2017 it was announced that the brothers would be coached by Ante Kostelić.

In January 2021, he won World Cup points for the first time, finishing 15th in his home race at Sljeme. Samuel and his brother Elias are coached by Ivica Kostelić and his father Ante.

World Cup results

Season standings

Standings through 26 February 2023

References

External links

1999 births
Living people
Croatian male alpine skiers
Olympic alpine skiers of Croatia
Alpine skiers at the 2018 Winter Olympics
Alpine skiers at the 2022 Winter Olympics
Alpine skiers at the 2016 Winter Youth Olympics